The Town Clerk of London is an important position that has existed since the 13th century in the City of London, England. Originally the role was to take the minutes of London council meetings, but over the years the holder's role has gathered responsibility, including staff and executive powers. Historically the incumbent received an annual fee of £10. This has risen to £244,000 in 2016/17, with 55%  coming from the City Fund and 40% coming from the City's Cash.

Responsibilities
The Town Clerk of London has been responsible for recording the minutes of the council of the Corporation of London and its committees since 1274. But historically, the Town Clerk of London's role was also one of a legal advisor and recorder of city law. The Town Clerk has worked at the Guildhall in London since 1411. Today the Guildhall is still used for official functions. 

The elected City of London council assumed legislative functions and adopted financial powers as confirmed by charters of 1377 and 1383 and as written by a series of Town Clerk of London with the council approval. The council, with the Town Clerk, has amended the civic constitution, regulated the election of Lord Mayor and other officials, and amended the functions of the City of London courts via writs.

These series of changes were successful in expanding the duties of the Town clerk position and leading to the similar expansion of the City of London courts which had jurisdiction outside London as a type of county court. This gradually took over from the now obsolete circuit criminal court called the Assize Court. The format strongly influenced the development of the High Court of Chancery and Lord Chancellor's jurisdiction based in Westminster.

During the early 17th century, before and after the 1666 Great Fire of London, the Town Clerk's function began to evolve into more complex and multiple roles. The more modern era of the Town Clerk as an executive requires more assistants.

Today the Lord Mayor of the City of London is assisted in his or her day-to-day work by three leading personnel whose titles are the Town Clerk and Chief Executive, the Chamberlain and the Remembrancer.

Town Clerk and Chief Executive
By 2009 the actual title of Town Clerk had resolved into its combined Town Clerk and Chief Executive type position, which is much more than a recorder of minutes of the city council.

As at 2012, The Town Clerk and Chief Executive of the City of London was John Barradell. The Town Clerk's Department manages hundreds of officers and employees of the Corporation. He will end his service to the City of London on 31 December 2022 and be replaced by Ian Thomas in February 2023.

Duties include:
 
Efficient management and execution of City functions.
Primary advisor on policy and resources.
Servicing meetings of the Court of Common Council and designated committees.
Servicing meetings of the Court of Aldermen and designated committees.
Investigating complaints against the City.
Electoral Registration Officer.
Overseer of public relations.
Overseer of economic development.
Overseer of human resources.

The noted Town Clerk of London 
John Carpenter was one of the most famous of London's town clerks, and was the author of the first book of English Common Law called "Liber Albus" (the White Book). The statue of John Carpenter, now residing within the City of London School, shows him holding this book. John Carpenter  (1372–1442) also in 1442 bequeathed land to the Corporation of London intended to fund the maintenance and education of four boys born within the City, who would be called 'Carpenter's children'. This later became the City of London School.

Town Clerks of London
List of the known Town Clerks of London from 1274 to 2023, covering 749 years

‡ Date of election

References

External links
 City of London website
 City of London School web site
 City of London Corporation – Town Clerk & Chief Executive picture at: https://web.archive.org/web/20101225080704/http://www.cityoflondon.gov.uk/Corporation/LGNL_Services/Council_and_democracy/Council_departments/ 
 Guildhall – https://web.archive.org/web/20080513213124/http://www.cityoflondon.gov.uk/Corporation/LGNL_Services/Leisure_and_culture/Local_history_and_heritage/Buildings_within_the_City/guildhall.htm City of London Corporation homepage on the Guildhall.

City and town clerks
City of London
 
History of the City of London